Elbo was, according to Herodotus' Histories, a man-made island of ash and earth where the blind Egyptian king Anysis lived during his 50 years of exile while the Ethiopian king Sabacos ruled Egypt. Supposedly, the island was built up because Egyptians who were bringing food to Anysis were also told to bring him ashes as a gift. Elbo and Anysis are unknown except outside of Herodotus, but Sabacos may refer to Shabaka, a Kushite pharaoh of Egypt's Twenty-fifth Dynasty. As Heroditus states in Book II of his Histories:

References

Geography of ancient Egypt